WGOV may refer to:

 WGOV-FM, a radio station (96.7 FM) licensed to serve Valdosta, Georgia, United States
 WGUN, a radio station (950 AM) licensed to serve Valdosta, Georgia, which held the call sign WGOV until 2013